Richard Thornden was an eminent 16th-century priest.  In 1524 he was appointed Warden of Canterbury College, Oxford and after that was a Prebendary at Canterbury Cathedral. Appointed the second Bishop of Dover in 1545, he held  the post until his death in 1557.

Notes

1557 deaths
16th-century Church of England bishops
Bishops of Dover, Kent
Year of birth missing
Wardens of Canterbury College, Oxford